The Phaistos Disc (also spelled Phaistos Disk, Phaestos Disc) is a disk of fired clay from the Minoan palace of Phaistos on the island of Crete, possibly dating to the middle or late Minoan Bronze Age (second millennium BC). Its purpose and its original place of manufacture remain disputed. It is now on display at the archaeological museum of Heraklion.

The disc was discovered in 1908 by the Italian archaeologist Luigi Pernier in the Minoan palace-site of Phaistos, and features 241 tokens, comprising 45 distinct signs, which were apparently made by pressing hieroglyphic "seals" into a disc of soft clay, in a clockwise sequence spiralling toward the center of the disk.

The Phaistos Disc captured the imagination of amateur and professional archaeologists, and many attempts have been made to decipher the code behind the disc's signs. While it is not clear that it is a script, most attempted decipherments assume that it is; most additionally assume a syllabary, others an alphabet or logography. Attempts at decipherment are generally thought to be unlikely to succeed unless more examples of the signs are found, as it is generally agreed that there is not enough context available for a meaningful analysis. 

Although the Phaistos Disc is generally accepted as authentic by archaeologists, a few scholars believe that the disc is a forgery or a hoax.

Discovery 

The Phaistos Disc was discovered in the Minoan palace-site of Phaistos, near Hagia Triada, on the south coast of Crete; specifically the disc was found in the basement of room 8 in building 101 of a group of buildings to the northeast of the main palace. This grouping of four rooms also served as a formal entry into the palace complex.

The disc was found in the main cell of an underground "temple depository". These basement cells, only accessible from above, were neatly covered with a layer of fine plaster. Their content was poor in precious artifacts, but rich in black earth and ashes, mixed with burnt bovine bones. The site apparently collapsed as a result of an earthquake, possibly linked with the eruption of the Santorini volcano that affected large parts of the Mediterranean region during the mid-2nd millennium B.C.

Authenticity 
The Phaistos Disc is generally accepted as authentic by archaeologists. The assumption of authenticity is based on the excavation records by Luigi Pernier. This assumption is supported by the later discovery of the Arkalochori Axe with similar, though not identical, glyphs.

The possibility that the disc is a 1908 forgery or hoax has been raised by two scholars. According to a report in The Times, the date of manufacture has never been established by thermoluminescence dating. In his 2008 review, Robinson does not endorse the forgery arguments, but argues that "a thermoluminescence test for the Phaistos Disc is imperative. It will either confirm that new finds are worth hunting for, or it will stop scholars from wasting their effort."

A gold signet ring from Knossos (the Mavro Spilio ring), found in 1926, contains a Linear A inscription developed in a field defined by a spiral—similar to the Phaistos Disc. A sealing found in 1955 shows the only known parallel to sign 21 (𐇤, the "comb") of the Phaistos disc. This is considered as evidence that the Phaistos Disc is a genuine Minoan artifact.

Dating 
Yves Duhoux (1977) dates the disc to between 1850 B.C. and 1600 B.C. (MMIII in Minoan chronology) on the basis of Luigi Pernier's report, which says that the disc was in a Middle Minoan undisturbed context. Jeppesen (1963) dates it to after 1400 (LMII–LMIII in Minoan chronology). Doubting the viability of Pernier's report, Louis Godart (1990) resigns himself to admitting that archaeologically, the disc may be dated to anywhere in Middle or Late Minoan times (MMI–LMIII, a period spanning most of the second millennium B.C.). J. Best suggests a date in the first half of the 14th century B.C. (LMIIIA) based on his dating of tablet PH-1.

Movable type 
The disc is an early example of what would later be known as movable type printing. 

The inscription was likely made by pressing hieroglyphic "seals" into the soft clay, in a clockwise sequence spiraling toward the center of the disk. It was then fired at high temperature. The unique character of the Phaistos Disc stems from the fact that the entire text was inscribed in this way, reproducing a body of text with reusable characters.

As a medieval example of the same technique, he goes on to cite the Prüfening dedicatory inscription.

In his work on decipherment, Benjamin Schwartz also refers to the Phaistos Disc as "the first movable type".

In his popular science book Guns, Germs and Steel, Jared Diamond describes the disc as an example of a technological advancement that did not become widespread because it was made at the wrong time in history, and contrasts this with Gutenberg's printing press.

Inscription

Signs 
There are 242 tokens on the disc, comprising 45 distinct signs. Many of these 45 signs represent easily identifiable objects, such as plants. In addition to these, there is a small diagonal line that occurs underneath the final sign in a group a total of 18 times. The disc shows traces of corrections made by the scribe in several places. The 45 symbols were numbered by Arthur Evans from 01 to 45, and this numbering has become the conventional reference used by most researchers. Some symbols have been compared with Linear A characters by Nahm, Timm, and others. Other scholars (J. Best, S. Davis) have pointed to similar resemblances with the Anatolian hieroglyphs, or with Egyptian hieroglyphs (A. Cuny). In the table below, the character "names" as given by Louis Godart (1995) are given in upper case; where other description or elaboration applies, they are given in lower case.

The frequency distribution of the Phaistos Disc signs is:

The nine hapaxes (symbols occurring just once) are 04 (A5), 05 (B3), 11 (A13), 15 (B8), 17 (A24), 30 (B27), 42 (B9), 43 (B4), 44 (A7). Of the eight twice-occurring symbols, four (03, 21, 28, 41) occur on side A only, three (09, 16, 20) on side B only, and only one (14) occurs on both sides.

Oblique stroke signs 
There are a number of signs marked with an oblique stroke; the strokes are not imprinted but carved by hand, and are attached to the first or last sign of a "word", depending on the direction of reading chosen. Their meaning is a matter of discussion. One hypothesis, supported by Evans, Duhoux, Ohlenroth and others, is that they were used to subdivide the text into paragraphs, but alternative meanings have been offered by other scholars.

Directionality 
Evans, at one point, published an assertion that the disc had been written, and should be read, from the center out; because it would have been easiest to place the inscription first and then size the disc to fit the text. There is general agreement that he was wrong, and Evans himself later changed his mind: the inscription was made, and should be read, from the outside in toward the centre. The centres of the spirals are not in the centre of the disc, and some of the symbols near the centre are crowded, as though the maker was cramped for space. One pair of symbols is set top-to-bottom, so it is hard to tell what order they should be in. Except in the cramped section, when there are overstrikes, the inner symbol overlies the outer symbol. Jean Faucounau has proposed a reconstruction of the scribe's movements, which would also require an inward direction; Yves Duhoux says that any outward reading may be discarded. Despite this consensus, there are still a few such attempted decipherments (See Phaistos Disc decipherment claims).

In addition to the question of the directionality of the text on the disc itself, different viewpoints are held as to how the Phaistos Disc characters should be displayed when transcribed into text. The disc itself probably has right-to-left directionality, if reading proceeds from the outside to the centre; this means that the reading direction is into the faces of the people and animals, as it is in Egyptian and Anatolian. Phaistos Disc characters are shown with left-to-right directionality in this article, with the glyphs mirrored compared to their orientation on the disc; which is also the typical practice for edited Egyptian and Anatolian hieroglyphic text.

Inscription text 
The following is a rendering of the Phaistos Disc inscription in Unicode characters:

Side A 
¦ 𐇑𐇛𐇜𐇐𐇡𐇽 | 𐇧𐇷𐇛 | 𐇬𐇼𐇖𐇽 | 𐇬𐇬𐇱 | 𐇑𐇛𐇓𐇷𐇰 | 𐇪𐇼𐇖𐇛 | 𐇪𐇻𐇗 | 𐇑𐇛𐇕𐇡[.] | 𐇮𐇩𐇲 | 𐇑𐇛𐇸𐇢𐇲 | 𐇐𐇸𐇷𐇖 | 𐇑𐇛𐇯𐇦𐇵𐇽 | 𐇶𐇚 | 𐇑𐇪𐇨𐇙𐇦𐇡 | 𐇫𐇐𐇽 | 𐇑𐇛𐇮𐇩𐇽 | 𐇑𐇛𐇪𐇪𐇲𐇴𐇤 | 𐇰𐇦 | 𐇑𐇛𐇮𐇩𐇽 | 𐇑𐇪𐇨𐇙𐇦𐇡 | 𐇫𐇐𐇽 | 𐇑𐇛𐇮𐇩𐇽 | 𐇑𐇛𐇪𐇝𐇯𐇡𐇪 | 𐇕𐇡𐇠𐇢 | 𐇮𐇩𐇛 | 𐇑𐇛𐇜𐇐 | 𐇦𐇢𐇲𐇽 | 𐇙𐇒𐇵 | 𐇑𐇛𐇪𐇪𐇲𐇴𐇤 | 𐇜𐇐 | 𐇙𐇒𐇵 |

Side B 
¦ 𐇑𐇛𐇥𐇷𐇖 | 𐇪𐇼𐇖𐇲 | 𐇑𐇴𐇦𐇔𐇽 | 𐇥𐇨𐇪 | 𐇰𐇧𐇣𐇛 | 𐇟𐇦𐇡𐇺𐇽 | 𐇜𐇐𐇶𐇰 | 𐇞𐇖𐇜𐇐𐇡 | 𐇥𐇴𐇹𐇨 | 𐇖𐇧𐇷𐇲 | 𐇑𐇩𐇳𐇷 | 𐇪𐇨𐇵𐇐 | 𐇬𐇧𐇧𐇣𐇲 | 𐇟𐇝𐇡 | 𐇬𐇰𐇐 | 𐇕𐇲𐇯𐇶𐇰 | 𐇑𐇘𐇪𐇐 | 𐇬𐇳𐇖𐇗𐇽 | 𐇬𐇗𐇜 | 𐇬𐇼𐇖𐇽 | 𐇥𐇬𐇳𐇖𐇗𐇽 | 𐇪𐇱𐇦𐇨 | 𐇖𐇡𐇲 | 𐇖𐇼𐇖𐇽 | 𐇖𐇦𐇡𐇧 | 𐇥𐇬𐇳𐇖𐇗𐇽 | 𐇘𐇭𐇶𐇡𐇖 | 𐇑𐇕𐇲𐇦𐇖 | 𐇬𐇱𐇦𐇨 | 𐇼𐇖𐇽 |

There are 61 "words" on the Disc; 31 on side A and 30 on side B (numbered A1 to A31 and B1 to B30, outside to inside), here read outside-to-inside (putting the "plumed head" signs word-initially and the strokes word-finally). The shortest words are two symbols in length, the longest seven symbols. The strokes are here transcribed as diagonal strokes. The transcription begins at the vertical line of five dots, circling the rim of the disc once, clockwise (13 words on A, 12 words on B) before spiralling toward the center (18 more words on each side). There is one word-final effaced sign at A8, which Godart (1995:101) notes as resembling sign 3 or 20; or less probably 8 or 44. Evans considered side A as the front side, but technical arguments have since been forwarded favouring side B as the front side.

Sides A and B left-to-right orientation 
The signs in the transcription below appear in left-to-right orientation:

Numerical transcription 
In numerical transcription, these are:

Side A 
02-12-13-01-18/ 24-40-12 29-45-07/ 29-29-34 02-12-04-40-33 27-45-07-12 27-44-08 02-12-06-18-? 31-26-35 02-12-41-19-35 01-41-40-07 02-12-32-23-38/ 39-11

02-27-25-10-23-18 28-01/ 02-12-31-26/ 02-12-27-27-35-37-21 33-23 02-12-31-26/ 02-27-25-10-23-18 28-01/ 02-12-31-26/ 02-12-27-14-32-18-27 06-18-17-19 31-26-12 02-12-13-01 23-19-35/ 10-03-38 02-12-27-27-35-37-21 13-01 10-03-38

Side B 
02-12-22-40-07 27-45-07-35 02-37-23-05/ 22-25-27 33-24-20-12 16-23-18-43/ 13-01-39-33 15-07-13-01-18 22-37-42-25 07-24-40-35 02-26-36-40 27-25-38-01

29-24-24-20-35 16-14-18 29-33-01 06-35-32-39-33 02-09-27-01 29-36-07-08/ 29-08-13 29-45-07/ 22-29-36-07-08/ 27-34-23-25 07-18-35 07-45-07/ 07-23-18-24 22-29-36-07-08/ 09-30-39-18-07 02-06-35-23-07 29-34-23-25 45-07/

The "plumed head" (02) only ever occurs word-initially, in 13 instances followed by the "shield" (12, which in some instances also occurs word-finally). Six words occur twice each:

The three-word sequence 02-27-25-10-23-18 28-01/ 02-12-31-26/ occurs twice (A14-16, A20-22). 02-12-31-26/ recurs for a third time (A19). Four more words occur twice each, 02-12-27-27-35-37-21 (A17, A29), 10-03-38 (A28, A31), 22-29-36-07-08/ (B21, B26) and 29-45-07/ (A3, B20).

Corrections 
The disc shows signs of corrections having been made, with some signs erased and over-printed by other signs.

Godart (1995:99-107) describes these corrections as occurring in the following words: A1 (signs 02-12-13-01), A4 (29-29-34) together with A5 (02-12-04), A8 (12), A10 (02-41-19?-35), A12 (12), A16 (12-31-26?), A17 (second 27?), A29 (second 27?), B1 (12-22), B3 (37?), B4 (22-25 imprinted over the same), B10 (07?-24?-40?), B13 (beside 29?). Question marks indicate uncertainty about that particular sign being the result of a correction.

The borders of word B28 were also widened to make room for sign 02.

Rotations 
The two signs 27 (Hide) in word A29 are rotated 180 degrees compared with all other occurrences of this sign: "head down" versus "head up". This rotation might be motivated by lack of space in A29.

The rotations of the signs 29 (Cat) and 31 (Eagle) have no lack of space. Defining the sign 29 in words B19, B20 and B21 as "head to the right", this presents as: head down in B29; head to the left in A3 and B15; head up in B18 and B26; head in between up and left in B13; head in between right and down in A4 (twice). The direction of the head of sign 31 is as follows: to the right in A16, up in A9 and A25, and to the left in A22.

The sign 02 (Plumed head) in word A29 is 90 degrees rotated to the right compared with all other occurrences of this sign. This might well be due to lack of space; the word is crowded and messy, with the sign 12 (Shield) pushed aside.

The two occurrences of sign 28 (Bull's leg) are not rotated compared with each other. Rather, the way this sign is shown in the literature (including Unicode), with the foot down, is rotated compared with the sign on the disc, with the foot up.

If assuming that the rotations are completely randomly distributed, then the probability that they end up in only two (or three) signs is very small. This suggests that these rotations might be deliberate.

Signs in adjacent windings 
There are several occurrences on side A where the same sign is at two places near each other in adjacent windings of the spiral, such as the Plumed Head (sign 02) in word A1 and the Plumed Head in word A14. Three patterns of such occurrences have been identified. A computer analysis of one of them (involving most of the Plumed Head signs on side A) has been performed with the conclusion that the probability of this pattern being coincidental is small. The existence of the two other patterns further decreases the probability of coincidence.

Several occurrences were caused by a correction. The orientation of the signs so seems to be relevant: the two Hides (sign 27) in word A29 are upside down, with the "heads" pointing to the Hide sign in the adjacent winding in word A23. If these occurrences are not coincidental, this narrows the potential meanings of the Disc, as it would not be a one-dimensional text.

Decipherment attempts 

A great deal of speculation developed around the disc during the 20th century, particularly capturing the imagination of amateur archeologists. Many attempts have been made to decipher the code behind the disc's signs, with a wide variety of theories having been suggested, including prayers, a narrative or an adventure story, a "psalterion", a call to arms, a board game, and a geometric theorem; some of these theories are considered to be pseudoarchaeology, with little realistic chance of being accurate.

Most linguistic interpretations assume a syllabary, based on the proportion of 45 symbols in a text of 241 tokens typical for that type of script; some assume a syllabary with interspersed logographic symbols, a property of every known syllabary of the Ancient Near East (Linear B as well as cuneiform and hieroglyphic writing). There are, however, also alphabetic and purely logographical interpretations.

While enthusiasts still believe the mystery can be solved, scholarly attempts at decipherment are thought to be unlikely to succeed unless more examples of the signs turn up elsewhere, as it is generally thought that there is not enough context available for meaningful analysis. Any decipherment without external confirmation, such as successful comparison to other inscriptions, is unlikely to be accepted as conclusive.

Origin of the script

Cretan or foreign origin 
There are a few main theories about the origin of the signs. For the first few decades after its discovery most scholars argued strongly against the local origin of the artifact. Evans (1909:24f.) wrote that:

Glotz (1925:381) observed that the clay was not from Crete. Ipsen (1929:15) concluded that the disc was certainly from somewhere on the Aegean. Because of its differences from Linear A or B, Ipsen found it tempting to assume, like Evans, a non-Cretan origin for the Disc. He observes, however, that since Linear A was a common Aegean script such an assumption will not resolve the problem of multiplicity.

The Arkalochori Axe and other finds have made Cretan origin more popular: female images with pendulous breasts have also been found at Malia and Phaistos. (Godart 1995:125). Duhoux asserts the Cretan provenance of the Disc; in his review of current research, Trauth (1990:154) concludes that "Crete as [the] source of the Disc can no longer be called into question." Andrew Robinson (2008), in a review in Nature, wrote "Most scholars today, including Duhoux, think it a plausible working hypothesis that the disc was made in Crete."

Original invention or derivation 
Ipsen (1929:11) also speaks against an entirely independent origin of the scripts, arguing that its inventors did not leap from no knowledge of writing to a syllabic script with these elegant signs. He goes on to cite Hieroglyphic Luwian as a "perfect parallel" (Ipsen 1929:17) of an original script inspired under the direct influence of other scripts (its symbol values inspired by cuneiform, its shapes by Egyptian hieroglyphs).

Schwartz (1956:108) asserts a genetic relationship between the Phaistos Disc script and the Cretan linear scripts.

Among the known scripts, there are three main candidates for being related to the Disc's script, all of them partly syllabic, partly logographic: Linear A, Anatolian hieroglyphs and Egyptian hieroglyphs. More remote possibilities are comparison with the Phoenician abjad or the Byblos syllabary.

Linear A 

Some signs are close enough to both Linear A and Linear B that they may have the same phonetic values, such as glyph 12 = 'qe', glyph 43 = 'ta'2, or glyph 31 = 'ku'. However, this opinion is not shared by all specialists of the Aegean Scripts.

A recent systematic comparison with Linear A is that of Torsten Timm, 2004. Based on the Linear A character distribution patterns collected by Facchetti, Timm concludes that the language of the disc inscription is the same as the language of Linear A. Timm identifies 20 of the 45 characters with Linear signs, assigning Linear B phonetic values to 16.

Anatolian hieroglyphs 

Achterberg et al. (2004) present a systematic comparison with Anatolian hieroglyphs, resulting in a full decipherment claim. In particular, they consider the stroke symbol cognate to the Luwian 'r(a/i)' symbol, but assign it the value '-ti'. The stroke on A3 is identified as the personal name determinative. Phaistos glyph 01 is compared to the logogram 'SARU', a walking man or walking legs in Luwian. 02 is compared to word-initial 'a2', a head with a crown in Luwian. The "bow" 11 is identified as the logogram 'sol suus', the winged sun known from Luwian royal seals. The "shield" 12 is compared to the near identical Luwian logogram 'TURPI' "bread" and assigned the value 'tu'. Phaistos glyph 39 is read as the "thunderbolt", logogram of Tarhunt, in Luwian a W-shaped hieroglyph.

List of decipherment claims 

The decipherment claims listed are categorized into linguistic decipherments, identifying the language of the inscription, and non-linguistic decipherments. A purely logographical reading is not linguistic in the strict sense: while it may reveal the meaning of the inscription, it will not allow for the identification of the underlying language.

Linguistic 
 George Hempl, 1911 (interpretation as Ionic Greek, syllabic writing); A-side first; reading inward
 Florence Stawell, 1911 (interpretation as Homeric Greek, syllabic writing); B-side first; reading inward
 Albert Cuny, 1914 (interpretation as an ancient Egyptian document, syllabic-logographic writing)
 Benjamin Schwarz, 1959 (interpretation as Mycenean Greek, syllabic writing, comparison to Linear B); A-side first; reading inward
 Jean Faucounau, 1975, (interpretation as "proto-Ionic" Greek, syllabic writing; A-side first; reading inward
 Vladimir I. Georgiev, 1976 (interpretation as Hittite language, syllabic writing); A-side first; reading outward
 Steven R. Fischer, 1988 (interpretation as a Greek dialect, syllabic writing); A-side first; reading inward
 Kjell Aartun, 1992 (interpretation as a Semitic language, syllabic writing); A-side first; reading outward
 Derk Ohlenroth, 1996 (interpretation as a Greek dialect, alphabetic writing); A-side first; reading outward; numerous homophonic signs
 Adam Martin, 2000 (interpretation as a Greek-Minoan bilingual text, alphabetic writing); reading outward, side A as Greek, side B as Minoan
 Achterberg et al., 2004 (interpreted as Luwian); A-side first; reading inward
 Torsten Timm, 2005 (syllabic writing, comparison to Linear A) B-side first; reading inward
 Gareth Alun Owens, 2007 (interpretation as Indo-European, syllabic writing, comparison to Linear A) A-side first; reading inward

Non-linguistic or logographic 
 Paolo Ballotta, 1974 (interpretation as logographic writing)
 Leon Pomerance, 1976 (interpretation as astronomical document)
 Reiner J. van Meerten, 1977 (interpretation as documentation of a gift to Minos)
 Peter Aleff, 1982
 Ole Hagen, 1988
 Harald Haarmann, 1990 (interpretation as logographic writing)
 Bernd Schomburg, 1997
 Patrick Berlingame, 2010 (interpretation as the mythical labyrinth)
 Hermann Wenzel, 1998
 Alan Butler, 1999 (interpretation as calendar)
 Friedhelm Will, 2000 (interpretation as number-philosophically-document of "Atlantean" origin)
 Axel Hausmann, 2002 (document from Atlantis, dated to 4400 B.C., logographic reading)
 Helène Whittaker, 2005 (a votive miniature version of a game board similar to the Egyptian Mehen)
 Wolfgang Reczko, 2009

Comparison with other scripts

Unicode 

A set of 46 Phaistos Disc characters, comprising 45 signs and one combining oblique stroke, have been encoded in Unicode since April 2008 (Unicode version 5.1). They are assigned to the range 101D0–101FF in Plane 1 (the Supplementary Multilingual Plane). Phaistos Disc characters were encoded with strong left-to-right directionality, and so in code charts and text (such as elsewhere on this page) the glyphs are mirrored from the way they appear on the disc itself.

Modern use 
Side A of the Phaistos Disc is used as the logo of FORTH, one of the largest research centers in Greece.

See also 
 Mehen (game)
 Arkalochori Axe
 Dispilio Tablet
 Cretan hieroglyphs
 Linear A

References

Further reading

General 
Balistier, Thomas. The Phaistos Disc – an account of its unsolved mystery, Verlag Thomas Balistier, 2000.
Bennett, Emmett L. (1996) — Aegean Scripts, (in The World's Writing Systems, Peter T. Daniels and William Bright (Eds.) Oxford: University Press. 
Chadwick, John. The Decipherment of Linear B, Cambridge University Press, 1958.
Duhoux, Yves. Le disque de phaestos, Leuven, 1977.
Duhoux, Yves. How not to decipher the Phaistos Disc, American Journal of Archaeology, Vol. 104, No. 3 (2000), pp. 597–600.
 Evans, A. J., Scripta Minoa, the written documents of Minoan Crete, with special reference to the archives of Knossos, Classic Books (1909), .
 Faure, P. "Tourne disque", l'énigme du disque de Phaistos, Notre Histoire n°213, October 2003 (PDF 0.7 Mb).
 Gaur, Albertine. 1984 — A History of Writing — Charles Scribner's Sons.
 Glotz, Gustave; Marryat Ross Dobie,  E. M. Riley, The Aegean Civilization" A. A. Knopf, 1925
Godart, Louis. The Phaistos Disc – the enigma of an Aegean script, ITANOS Publications, 1995.
Kober, Alice. The Minoan Scripts: Facts and Theory, American Journal of Archaeology, Vol. 52, No. 1 (1948), pp. 82–103.

 (PDF 0.5 Mb)
Trauth, Michael. The Phaistos Disc and the Devil's Advocate. On the Aporias of an Ancient Topic of Research. 1990, Glottometrika 12, pp. 151 – 173.
 International Phaistos Disk Conference 2008, sponsored by Minerva Magazine. abstracts

 Attempted decipherments 
Aartun, Kjell, 'Der Diskos von Phaistos; Die beschriftete Bronzeaxt; Die Inschrift der Taragona-tafel' in Die minoische Schrift : Sprache und Texte vol. 1,  Wiesbaden, Harrassowitz (1992) 
Achterberg, Winfried; Best, Jan; Enzler, Kees; Rietveld, Lia; Woudhuizen, Fred, The Phaistos Disc: A Luwian Letter to Nestor, Publications of the Henry Frankfort Foundation vol XIII, Dutch Archeological and Historical Society, Amsterdam 2004
Balistier, Thomas, The Phaistos Disc – an account of its unsolved mystery, Verlag Thomas Balistier, 2000 (as above); describes Aarten's and Ohlenroth's decipherments.
Ephron, Henry D, (1962), "Tharso and Iaon: The Phaistos Disk, Harvard Studies in Classical Philology, Vol. 66. (1962), pp. 1–91. JSTOR URL
Faucounau, Jean, Le déchiffrement du Disque de Phaistos & Les Proto-Ioniens : histoire d'un peuple oublié, Paris 1999 & 2001.
Fischer, Steven R., Evidence for Hellenic Dialect in the Phaistos Disk,  Herbert Lang (1988), 
Gordon, F. G. 1931. Through Basque to Minoan: transliterations and translations of the Minoan tablets. London: Oxford University Press.
Hausmann, Axel, Der Diskus von Phaistos. Ein Dokument aus Atlantis, BoD GmbH (2002), .
 
Martin, Adam, Der Diskos von Phaistos – Ein zweisprachiges Dokument geschrieben in einer frühgriechischen Alphabetschrift, Ludwig Auer Verlag (2000), .
Ohlenroth, Derk, Das Abaton des lykäischen Zeus und der Hain der Elaia: Zum Diskos von Phaistos und zur frühen griechischen Schriftkultur,  M. Niemeyer (1996), .
 Thomas G. Palaima, Emmet L. Bennet, Jr., Michael G.F. Ventris, Alice E.  Kober, "Cryptanalysis, Decipherment and the Phaistos Disc.", in M.-L. Nosch and H. Landenius-Enegren eds., Aegean Scripts, (Incunabula Graeca 105, Rome: 2017) vol. 2, pp. 771-788
Polygiannakis, Ο Δισκος της Φαιστού Μιλάει Ελληνικά (The Phaistos disk speaks in Greek),  Georgiadis, Athens (2000).
Pomerance, Leon, The Phaistos Disk: An Interpretation of Astronomical Symbols'',  Paul Astroms forlag, Goteborg (1976). reviewed by D. H. Kelley in The Journal of Archeoastronomy (Vol II, number 3, Summer 1979)

External links 

 
 
 
 
 Exploring the Enduring Mystery of Crete’s Phaistos Disc – AtlasObscura – 2022

2nd-millennium BC inscriptions
1908 archaeological discoveries
Ancient pottery
Archaeological artifacts
Archaeological discoveries in Greece
Art discs and ovals
Cretan hieroglyphs
Heraklion Archaeological Museum
History of printing
Individual ceramics
Inscriptions in undeciphered writing systems
Inscriptions in unknown languages
Minoan archaeological artifacts